Henry Spooner may refer to:

 Henry J. Spooner (1839–1918), U.S Representative from Rhode Island
 Henry Spooner (priest) (died 1929), Archdeacon of Maidstone